Takoradi Technical University is a public tertiary education institution (university) located in Sekondi-Takoradi, the capital of the Western Region of Ghana. Takoradi Technical University was established as a Government Technical Institute in 1954, and became part of the State Tertiary Education System. Later after the passage of the Polytechnic Law of 1992 (PNDCL 321). It was replaced by Polytechnics Law (Act 745) in 2007. In 2016, the Bill to convert six out of the 10 polytechnics (including Takoradi Polytechnic) into a fully fledged university received a unanimous approval of Ghanaian legislators.

Logo
The University logo is intended to capture essence of technical and vocational education. The circular nature of the logo symbolizes the completeness of the training and education nurtured at Polytechnic. The motto emblazoned around the edge reads: "Adwen, Akoma na Nsa ma mpuntu" literally "The brain (mind), heart and hands (skills) engender development."

The interior of the logo is an open book set against a red gear against a yellow background. The interior is intended to symbolize the technical and vocational education and training provided by the university. The Adinkra symbol of "Ntesie" or "Mate masie" (literally, "I have heard and I have kept it") is a Ghanaian cultural symbol for learning, which is set on a blue background with yellow waves representing the location of the institution near the sea.

The royal blue colour that encircles the emblems in the logo represents the global appeal of the education, and that "the sky the limit" for all students. The fire red colour symbolizes hard work and personal sacrifices which underlie success in all endeavours. The rich yellow colour encapsulates wealth that results from the application of the skills and knowledge acquired through the unique education at the Takoradi Polytechnic.

History

The 	Takoradi 	Technical 	University 	was 	established 	in September, 2016, as a result of the government's policy to convert Takoradi Polytechnic, among five other Polytechnics, to the status of Technical University. In effect, since April 1954, Takoradi Technical University (formerly Takoradi Polytechnic) has existed as a Government Technical Institute under the Ghana Education Service of the Ministry of Education.  During that period, the institute offered programmes mainly at the Craft and Technician Certificate levels in commercial and technical subjects, awarding Royal Society of Arts (RSA) and City and Guilds of London, United Kingdom. However, in 1990, the Ghana Education Service took over the awards of the above-mentioned certificates.

As part of the Ghana Educational Reforms which began in the 1980s, the Takoradi Technical Institute and five other similar institutions were upgraded by the Polytechnic Act 321 (PNDC Law 1993) to become part of the Ghana Tertiary Education System. The Polytechnics, per the law, began to offer Higher National Diploma (HND) programmers in the 1993/1994 academic year. These reforms mandated the polytechnics to complement the role of the Universities to increase access to tertiary education for the training of middle and higher-level manpower.
 
A Bill proposed by the Ministry of Education and considered by Cabinet of Government in 2014 was passed by Parliament as an Act in August 2016 with the assent of the President, converting some polytechnics into technical universities as full-fledged technical universities. In view of that, the Takoradi Polytechnic Council adopted the name "Takoradi Technical University" which has been duly registered with the Registrar General's Department of Ghana.
Currently, Takoradi Technical University has three (3) campuses: Effia Kuma (Takoradi), Butumagyebu (Sekondi) and Akatakyi (Agona-Nkwanta). The Akatakyi Campus is the largest of the three, with an acreage of 152.3.

Corporate partnerships
 The TTE Technical Training Group, a UK technical training school in the oil & gas industries announced a major partnership in Ghana with Tullow Oil to establish a new training centre aimed at equipping local technicians for work in the oil, gas, manufacturing, and mining industries. The Minister of Education, Professor Jane Naana Poku-Agyemang commissioned a $6 million Technical Training Centre in Takoradi Polytechnic to train Ghanaian students in these fields on 21 June 2013. The centre, named "Jubilee Technical Training Centre," was co-sponsored by the Oil Jubilee Partners, Tullow Ghana Limited, Anadarko WCTP Company, Kosmos Energy, Ghana National Petroleum Company, and Sabre Oil/Gas Holding Limited. The centre is the first in West Africa to offer diploma accredited qualifications to support industry and commerce in Ghana
 As part of an effort to provide practical training for undergraduates, as well as an effort to improve the institution's business relationships, Accra Brewery Limited signed a Memorandum of Understanding (MOU) with Takoradi Polytechnic. The MOU, which covers a four-year period, allows students to learn at the brewery.

Awards and achievements
 Takoradi Polytechnic was nominated as the Best Regional Polytechnic in Science and Education by the Europe Business Assembly (EBA), a vanity award. In a statement signed by the EBA International Relations Manager Anna Gorobets, the award is in recognises the Polytechnic Institutes professionalism in teaching and learning, the quality of its researchers, the introduction and realization of international programmes, and the institution's contributions to national educational development. The statement added that the Rector of the Polytechnic will be presented with an award for the 'Best Manager of the Year' in the science and education field.
 Takoradi Polytechnic received an award for being the best in examination ethics in Ghana for the year 2012 by the Exam Ethics Marshals International (EEMI). The Rector of the Polytechnic, Reverend Professor Daniel Agyapong Nyarko, was also named an honorary Exam Ethics Master Marshal for his contribution towards ensuring transparency and integrity in the conduct of examinations.
 Takoradi Polytechnic was ranked the first among polytechnics in Ghana for the second time running by the world universities ranking body, Webomatics, the largest public research body known for its scientific methods in web ranking. The Polytechnic maintained its 2012 first position among polytechnics in Ghana and placed third in Sub-Saharan Africa, coming after Auchi Polytechnic and Yaba College of Technology.

References

External links
 

Polytechnics in Ghana
Sekondi-Takoradi
Educational institutions established in 1954
1954 establishments in Gold Coast (British colony)
Education in the Western Region (Ghana)